Heimi Peak is a mountain on the border of Wangcheng District, Changsha County, Kaifu District and Miluo City in Hunan, China.

History
It has been designated as a provincial forest park in May 2000 and a national forest park in 2011.

In June 2016 it was categorized as an AAAA level tourist site by the China National Tourism Administration.

Geography
Heimi Peak is protected within Heimi Peak National Forest Park.

Reservoir 
Heimi Peak Reservoir is a medium-sized reservoir located on mountainside of Heimi Peak.

Temple
The Heimi Peak Temple is a Buddhist temple on the top of Heimi Peak.

Public Access
Trails are available for hiking, biking and mountaineering.

Gallery

References

Bibliography
 

Wangcheng District
Mountains of Hunan